Satánico pandemonium is a 1975 Mexican nunsploitation horror film directed by Gilberto Martínez Solares and written by Jorge Barragán, Adolfo Martínez Solares and Gilberto Martínez Solares. It stars Cecilia Pezet, Enrique Rocha and Delia Magaña.

Plot

Sister Maria lives with the convent for her charity works, but in the secret downs of her fantasies, she becomes agonized by visions from another world, a world in which she is permitted to run free. In this world Satan is her lord, and her acts of violence and blasphemy mount. Sister Maria realizes that she is elected by the Devil himself to destroy the convent and lead her sister nuns into hell. Only the Devil can intuit the dark secrets of her tortured mind.

Cast
 Enrique Rocha as Luzbel / Lucifer
 Cecilia Pezet	as Sister Maria
 Delia Magaña		
 Clemencia Colin		
 Sandra Torres		
 Adarene San Martin		
 Patricia Alban		
 Yayoi Tokawa		
 Amparo Fustenberg		
 Paula Aack		 	
 Laura Montalvo		
 Verónica Ávila		
 Leo Villanueva		
 Daniel Albertos		
 Verónica Rivas		
 Valeria Lupercio

Production
Shooting began in the spring of 1974 in the convents at Tepoztlán, Morelos and Morelia, Michoacán in Mexico. It was inspired by Ken Russell’s The Devils. The film inspired Salma Hayek's character Santanico Pandemonium in From Dusk Till Dawn.

Release
It premiered on 26 June 1975 as La sexorcista in the cinemas in Mexico and was released on 24 October 1987 as Satanic Pandemonium: The Sexorcist by Eagle Video on VHS. The DVD was released on 31 May 2005 by Mondo Macabro in the United States.

Soundtrack
The score was composed by Gustavo César Carrión.

Genre
The film apparently is a delirious amalgam of the then popular materials from Satan, witch hunter horror and nunsploitation.

See also
 Alucarda: a 1977 Mexican horror film also dealing with similar theme

References

External links
 
 Satanico pandemonium at Eccentric Cinema

1975 films
1975 horror films
1975 LGBT-related films
1970s exploitation films
1970s horror thriller films
1970s Mexican films
1970s Spanish-language films
Female bisexuality in film
Films critical of the Catholic Church
Films set in Mexico
Films shot in Mexico
LGBT-related horror thriller films
Mexican LGBT-related films
Mexican horror thriller films
Nunsploitation films